József Keller (born 25 September 1965) is a Hungarian former professional footballer who played as a defender or midfielder.

References

Living people
Hungarian footballers
1965 births
Association football midfielders
Association football defenders
People from Nagykanizsa
Ferencvárosi TC footballers
Red Star F.C. players
Hungary international footballers
Wasquehal Football players
Sportspeople from Zala County